The Kingman County Courthouse, located at 130 Spruce Street in Kingman, Kansas, is an historic 3-story redbrick courthouse building set on a ground-floor basement of rough-faced white limestone. The stairway and entrance portico leading to the main entrance are of the same limestone. Its roof is basically hipped with gables in the middle of each side, pyramids on each corner and an octagonal shaped cupola rising from the center. Built in 1907-08 for Kingman County, it is one of 15 courthouses (13 in Kansas and one each in Illinois and Oklahoma) designed by architect George P. Washburn of Ottawa, Kansas. His design for this building has been called a mixture of Late Victorian, Romanesque, Free Classical and Queen Anne architectural styles.

On September 11, 1985, the Kingman County Courthouse was added to the National Register of Historic Places.

References

Buildings and structures in Kingman County, Kansas
County courthouses in Kansas
Government buildings completed in 1908
Courthouses on the National Register of Historic Places in Kansas
National Register of Historic Places in Kingman County, Kansas
1908 establishments in Kansas